Kerioth (Qǝrīyyōṯ) is the name of two cities mentioned in the Hebrew Bible. The spelling Kirioth appears in the King James Version of Amos 2:2. The name means "cities," and is the plural of the Biblical Hebrew קריה.

 A town in the south of Judea. Judas Iscariot was probably a native, hence his name "Iscariot". It has been identified with the ruins of El Kureitein, about 10 miles south of Hebron.
 A city of Moab, called Kirioth.

References

Hebrew Bible cities
Judas Iscariot